U.S. Route 73 (US 73) is a north–south United States highway that runs for  from northeast Kansas to southeast Nebraska. The highway's southern terminus is Bonner Springs, Kansas at I-70.  Its northern terminus is near Dawson, Nebraska at US 75.

Route description

Kansas

U.S. Route 73 begins at I-70 in Kansas City in a concurrency with U.S. Route 24, U.S. Route 40, and K-7. Two miles north of its terminus, US 24 and US 40 turn west, while US 73 continues north with K-7. It continues north with K-7 through Lansing, where it intersects K-5. US 73 and K-7 then continue through Leavenworth. It goes northwesterly from Leavenworth, meeting K-192 near Easton and at Atchison, turns west. At Atchison, it loses K-7 and is briefly concurrent with U.S. Route 59. It goes west and turns northwest near Lancaster at its intersection with K-9. It goes through Huron and begins a concurrency with K-20 near Everest. It goes west into Horton and intersects U.S. Route 159. The two highways continue north together and meet U.S. Route 36 at Hiawatha. After a brief northwesterly routing through Reserve, US 73 and US 159 turn north and enter Nebraska.

Nebraska
U.S. Routes 73 and 159 enter Nebraska northwest of Reserve, Kansas.  U.S. Route 159 turns east in Falls City, Nebraska toward Rulo, Nebraska and continues east toward Interstate 29 in Missouri.  A few miles north of Falls City, U.S. Route 73 turns west, passes through Verdon, and ends at U.S. Route 75 just north of Dawson, Nebraska.

History
The original southern terminus was at Atoka, Oklahoma at an intersection with U.S. Highway 75.  From the creation of the highway in 1926 until April 11, 1935, US 73 was split between Oswego, Kansas and Horton, Kansas.  US 73E followed modern US 160 from Oswego to Columbus, then modern US 69 to Kansas City, where it then latched onto what is now US 73.  The US 73E designated then went from Kansas City to Horton.  US 73W followed the route of modern U.S. Route 59 from Oswego to K-39, K-39 west to Chanute, modern U.S. Route 169 from Chanute to Garnett, modern US 59 again from Garnett to Nortonville, and then modern U.S. Route 159 from Nortonville to Horton.  On April 10, 1935, US 73 was truncated at Kansas City with the modern designations taking over the old routes and US 69 taking over the Atoka-Oswego segment.  In Kansas City, US 73 previously followed U.S. Route 24 into downtown Kansas City, Kansas, terminating at the Intercity Viaduct (Lewis and Clark Viaduct), before Interstate 435 was completed. After I-435 was completed, US 73 ended at its intersection with I-435. On December 1, 2008, the southern terminus was rerouted, along with US 24 and US 40, southward along K-7 to its new terminus at I-70.

Nebraska also had a split highway, with the split between Tekamah and Winnebago between 1935 and 1957.  US 73E went north through Decatur along the current route of U.S. Route 75, while US 73W went west from Tekamah along current Nebraska Highway 32 to Oakland, then north from Oakland in a concurrency with U.S. Route 77.

The original northern terminus was south of Auburn, Nebraska, near Howe, Nebraska. US 73 went east through Howe, then south to Stella, Nebraska, then east through Shubert, Nebraska, then south to the current highway. In 1932, the highway was extended to South Sioux City, Nebraska. In 1965, the route was shortened to Winnebago, Nebraska.  In 1984, U.S. 75 was removed from western Iowa along Interstate 29 and placed on U.S. 73's route, superseding it through Omaha, Nebraska and truncating the highway to its present northern terminus near Dawson, Nebraska.

K-227 was a highway in Kansas that was designated on September 9, 1968. K-227's southern terminus was at K-4 and U.S. Route 59 (US-59) in the city of Atchison and the northern terminus was at K-9 and US-73 in Atchison. In 1980, US-73 was realigned along K-227 and at that time K-227 was decommissioned.

Major intersections

See also

 List of United States Numbered Highways

Notes

References

External links

 Endpoints of U.S. Highway 73

 
73
73
73
73
Transportation in Wyandotte County, Kansas
Transportation in Leavenworth County, Kansas
Transportation in Atchison County, Kansas
Transportation in Brown County, Kansas
Transportation in Richardson County, Nebraska